La Rage au corps (US title: Tempest in the Flesh, UK title: Fire in the Blood) is a 1954 French drama film directed by Ralph Habib, based on story by Jean-Claude Aurel and Jacques Companéez. The film tells the story of a nymphomaniac, who would be saved only by really falling in love. It was filmed on location at the Pyrenees Mountains, Hautes-Pyrénées, France.

Main characters
Françoise Arnoul as Clara  
Raymond Pellegrin as Antonio "Tonio" Borelli 
Philippe Lemaire as Andre  
Jean-Claude Pascal as Gino

External links

La Rage au corps at Cinema-francais.fr

1954 films
1954 drama films
French drama films
Films directed by Ralph Habib
French black-and-white films
1950s French-language films
1950s French films